Antaeotricha spurca is a moth in the family Depressariidae. It was described by Philipp Christoph Zeller in 1855. It is found in Amazonas, Brazil.

References

Moths described in 1855
spurca
Moths of South America